"Ponies" is a 2010 fantasy story by American writer Kij Johnson. It was first published on Tor.com.

Plot summary
Barbara, like all little girls, has a magic talking pony with wings and a horn. Barbara and Sunny are invited to a ritual "cutting-out party", where she must destroy two of the three things that make her pony special.

Reception
"Ponies" won the 2010 Nebula Award for Best Short Story, (tied with "How Interesting: A Tiny Man" by Harlan Ellison), and was nominated for the Hugo Award for Best Short Story and the World Fantasy Award for Best Short Story.

Strange Horizons called the story a "grotesque".Lois Tilton considered the story to be "Highly Unsubtle." Chad Orzel described the story as "just dreadful", based on a central idea that was "preposterously contrived" and "a gigantic and unsubtle literalized metaphor", and with "essentially no plot."

References

External links
Text of the story on Tor.com

Nebula Award for Best Short Story-winning works
Short stories by Kij Johnson